Miss Polonia 2011 was the 37th Miss Polonia pageant, held on December 9, 2011. The winner was Marcelina Zawadzka of Pomerania and she represented Poland in Miss Universe 2012. Top 8 finalist, Justyna Rajczyk represented Poland in Miss Earth 2012.

Final results

Special Awards

Judges
 Rozalia Mancewicz - Miss Polonia 2010
 Elżbieta Wierzbicka - President of the Miss Polonia Office
 Kacper Kuszewski - Actor
 Adam Woronowicz - Actor
 Radosław Pazura - Actor

Official Delegates

Notes

Returns
Last competed in 2009:
 Lubusz
 Warmia-Masuria

Did not compete
 Polish Community in Argentina
 Polish Community in Australia
 Polish Community in Belarus
 Polish Community in Brazil
 Polish Community in Canada
 Polish Community in France
 Polish Community in Germany
 Polish Community in Ireland
 Polish Community in Israel
 Polish Community in Russia
 Polish Community in South Africa
 Polish Community in Sweden
 Polish Community in the U.K.
 Polish Community in the U.S.
 Polish Community in Venezuela

References

External links
Official Website

2011
2011 beauty pageants
2011 in Poland